Peter Varney may refer to:

 Pete Varney (born 1949), American college baseball coach and catcher
 Peter Varney (politician), New Hampshire politician